The following lists events that happened during 1935 in Chile.

Incumbents
President of Chile: Arturo Alessandri

Events

June
25 June – The Colegio Niño Jesús de Praga is founded.

Births 
date unknown – Cristián Huneeus (d. 1985)
22 June – Sergio Valdés (footballer) (d. 2019)
31 December – Mario Moreno (footballer) (d. 2005)

Deaths
date unknown – Tomás Guevara (b. 1865)
21 February – Luis Pardo (b. 1882)
October – Serafín López

References 

 
Years of the 20th century in Chile
Chile